Eugene Church (January 22, 1938 – April 3, 1993) was an American R&B singer and songwriter.

Church was born in St. Louis, Missouri. In the 1950s, he collaborated with Jesse Belvin releasing singles on Modern Records as The Cliques. Their 1956 single, "The Girl in My Dreams" b/w "I Wanna Know Why", peaked at #45 on the Billboard Hot 100.

Late in the 1950s, he released four singles of his own, as Eugene Church & the Fellows. The first two were U.S. hits: "Pretty Girls Everywhere" went No. 6 R&B, No. 36 Pop, and "Miami" hit No. 14 R&B and No. 67 Pop. They were followed by "Good News" and "Mind Your Own Business", neither of which charted. Church later pursued a career in gospel music in Dallas, Texas, and returned to secular music in the 1990s in doo-wop revues.

Church died from cancer in Los Angeles, California in April 1993, at age 55.

Discography

Modern Records 987 - '"Girl of My Dreams" / "I Wanna Know Why" 1956
Modern Records 995 - "I'm in Love (With a Girl)" / "My Desire" 1956
Specialty Records 604 - "Open Up Your Heart" / "How Long" 1957
Contender Records    - "It's True" (with The Hollywood Saxons) 1958
Knight Records 2012 - "Deacon Dan Tucker" / "Little Darling" 1958
Class Records 235 - "Pretty Girls Everywhere" / "For the Rest of My Life" 1958
Class Records 254 - "Miami" / "I Ain't Goin' For That" 1959
Class Records 261 - "Jack of All Trades" / "Without Soul" 1959
Class Records 266 - "The Struttin' Kind" / "That's What's Happnin'" 1960
Rendezvous 132 - "Good News" / "Polly" 1960
King Records 5545 - "Mind Your Own Business" / "You Got the Right Idea" 1961
King Records 5589 - "That's All I Want" / "Geneva" 1962
King Records 5610 - "Light of the Moon" / "I'm Your Taboo Man" 1962
King Records 5659 - "The Right Girl, the Right Time" / "Pretty Baby Won't You Come on Home" 1962
King Records 5715 - "Time Has Brought About a Change" / "Sixteen Tons" 1963

References

1938 births
1993 deaths
King Records artists
Modern Records artists
Specialty Records artists
Class Records artists
Deaths from cancer in California
Musicians from St. Louis
20th-century American singers
Singers from Missouri
20th-century American male singers